Line Arlien-Søborg (born 25 July 1966) is a Danish former actress and film director. In 1984, she received the Bodil and Robert Best Actress awards for the film Skønheden og udyret.

Film career 
In 1981, Arlien-Søborg first received attention for her role as the conniving schoolgirl, Anne-Mette, in Nils Malmros's coming-of-age drama Tree of Knowledge (Kundskabens træ). Filming for the role was performed over a two-year period, while Arlien-Søborg was 13 to 15 years old, to realistically show her character's physical and emotional maturation. Two years later, Arlien-Søborg performed the lead in Malmros' 1983 drama  Skønheden og udyret (Beauty and the Beast). Malmos wrote the role of the sexually blossoming 16-year-old Mette specifically for Arlien-Søborg for which she was awarded both the 1984 Bodil and Robert awards for Best Actress.

In 1986 Arlien-Søborg performed in the Danish television miniseries Kaj Munk and she once again performed for Malmros in his 1989 film . After completing an education in literature history, she worked for Denmark's DR Television studio where she wrote and directed the miniseries Derude med snøren. Arlien-Søborg subsequently worked as an assistant director for Malmros on two films, 2002's At kende sandheden (Facing the Truth) and Kærestesorger (in post-production in 2008).

She dissolved her friendship with Malmros in 2013 following the release of his autobiographical film Sorrow and Joy. Arlien-Søborg said that the film's portrayal of a mutual flirtation between her teenage self and Malmros was false; and that she believed Malmros had fictionalized the episode to absolve himself of sexualizing and trying to seduce a child.

Since 2014, Arlien-Søborg has worked as a teacher in Danish Language and Media Studies at a Gymnasium (upper secondary school) in Skanderborg.

Personal life 
Arlien-Søborg lives in Risskov with her husband and their two children.

Filmography

References

External links 
 
 
 

1966 births
Best Actress Bodil Award winners
Danish child actresses
Danish film actresses
Danish film directors
Danish television actresses
Living people
People from Aarhus
Best Actress Robert Award winners